The Spencer County Courthouse is a historic courthouse located at Rockport, Spencer County, Indiana. It was designed by architect Elmer E. Dunlap and built in 1921.  It is a three-story, rectangular, seven bay by five bay, Neoclassical style limestone building. The main facade features a projecting five bay central section with engaged Roman Doric ordercolumns.  The interior is organized around a central rotunda topped by a shallow stained glass dome.

It was listed on the National Register of Historic Places in 1999.

References

County courthouses in Indiana
Courthouses on the National Register of Historic Places in Indiana
Neoclassical architecture in Indiana
Government buildings completed in 1921
Buildings and structures in Spencer County, Indiana
National Register of Historic Places in Spencer County, Indiana